Stuart W. Epperson is co-founder and chairman of Salem Media Group, and a member and the president (as of 2016) of the conservative Council for National Policy ("CNP").

In 1984 and 1986, Epperson was the Republican nominee for the fifth Congressional district of North Carolina. In both races, Epperson was defeated by the incumbent Democrat, Stephen L. Neal.

Epperson attended Bob Jones University in Greenville, South Carolina, where he received a bachelor's degree in radio/television broadcasting and a master's degree in communications.

Epperson co-founded Salem Communications in 1972 with his brother-in-law, Edward G. Atsinger III, and oversaw its major expansion in hundreds of radio markets nationwide. He later oversaw its inclusion of conservative political opinion programming starting in 1990. Through his involvement in that entity, he is a member of the board of directors of the National Religious Broadcasters Association. Time Magazine has named him one of the 25 most influential evangelicals in America.

Epperson lives in Winston-Salem, North Carolina. His wife, Nancy, is on the Board of international Christian broadcaster Trans World Radio (TWR). He has four children, daughters Kristy, Karen, and Kathy, and son Stuart Jr.

Notes

External links
 Should Conservatives Support Decency Standards? by Stuart Epperson
 

1935 births
Living people
20th-century evangelicals
21st-century evangelicals
Bob Jones University alumni
Businesspeople from North Carolina
North Carolina Republicans
Politicians from Winston-Salem, North Carolina